Maristela Salvatori (born 1960), is an artist and printmaker. She has a degree in Fine Art from the Universidade Federal do Rio Grande do Sul, Instituto de Artes, where she teaches on the undergraduate and Postgraduate Visual Arts Programme and coordinates research into 0 Fascínio do Traço (The charm of the Line). She works with issues related to printmaking and photography and is currently head of the Postgraduate Visual Arts Programme. She is a co-author of the book Mestiçagens na Arte Contemporânea (organized by Icleia Cattani, Porto Alegre: UFRGS, 2007).

She lived in Paris for four years, taking a doctorate in Fine Art, at University of Paris 1 Pantheon-Sorbonne, living for two years in studio-accommodation at the Cité internationale des arts. She has participated in artist's residencies at Frans Masereel Centrum, Belgium (1998 - 2005). She has won awards in Paris, Recife, Ribeirão Preto, Porto Alegre and Curitiba, including GRAV'X 1999 in Paris.

Her solo shows at galleries and museums in France, Mexico and Brazil, include Galerie Michèle Broutta, Paris, 2000, Galeria Iberê Camargo, Usina do Gasômetro, Porto Alegre, 2004. Group exhibitions in Brazil and abroad include Points of Contact, Triangle Space, Chelsea College of Art & Design, London, 2009. Her work focuses on empty spaces, large planes, fragmentation and repetition.

References

External links
 Biografia de Maristela Salvatori
 UFRGS, Instituto de Artes Faculty
  Personal webpage

Brazilian artists
Academic staff of the Federal University of Rio Grande do Sul
Living people
1960 births
Pantheon-Sorbonne University alumni